Chagos Islanders v the United Kingdom (application no. 35622/04) was a case before the European Court of Human Rights decided in 2012 by an inadmissibility decision. The court, by a majority, ruled that as the Chagossians had accepted compensation from the United Kingdom government they had effectively renounced their "right to return" and as such their case was inadmissible.

See also
Right of return
Mauritius v. United Kingdom

References

External links
ECtHR press release

Chagos Archipelago sovereignty dispute
European Court of Human Rights cases involving the United Kingdom
2012 in case law
2012 in the United Kingdom